Duruhan is a village in Aydıncık district of Mersin Province, Turkey. It is a mountain village. The population of Duruhan was 297 as of 2012.

References

Villages in Aydıncık District (Mersin)